Parhamaxia is a genus of parasitic flies in the family Tachinidae. There are at least three described species in Parhamaxia.

Species
These three species belong to the genus Parhamaxia:
 Parhamaxia antennata Richter, 1991
 Parhamaxia discalis Mesnil, 1967
 Parhamaxia palposa Richter, 1991

References

Further reading

 
 
 
 

Tachinidae
Articles created by Qbugbot